Joseph Kauvai (born April 29, 1967) is a former weightlifter who competed for the Cook Islands. Kauvai competed at the 1988 Summer Olympics in Seoul, he entered the middle-heavyweight division in the weightlifting, where he finished 25th out of 28 starters.

References

External links
 

1967 births
Living people
Cook Island male weightlifters
Weightlifters at the 1988 Summer Olympics
Olympic weightlifters of the Cook Islands